Eduardo González Salvador (born 1 May 1960) is a Spanish former professional racing cyclist. He rode in the 1985 Tour de France.

References

External links
 

1960 births
Living people
Spanish male cyclists
Sportspeople from Bilbao
Cyclists from the Basque Country (autonomous community)